Luis Valbuena (born 26 January 1936) is a Spanish gymnast. He competed in eight events at the 1960 Summer Olympics.

References

1936 births
Living people
Spanish male artistic gymnasts
Olympic gymnasts of Spain
Gymnasts at the 1960 Summer Olympics
Gymnasts from Barcelona